Frederick William Russell, OC,  K.St.J, CD, LL.D (September 10, 1923 - June 20, 2001) was a Canadian businessman and the ninth lieutenant governor of Newfoundland.

Born in St. John's, he studied at Dalhousie University and the Atlantic School for Advanced Business Administration. He was a fighter pilot with the Royal Canadian Air Force during World War II in which he flew the de Havilland Mosquito. He was president of Blue Peter Steamships.

He was a member of the Newfoundland Labour Relations Board for over 35 years.

He was a founding member of the Royal Canadian Air Cadets in St. John's.

From 1991 to 1997, he was the lieutenant-governor of Newfoundland.

In 1979, he was made a Member of the Order of Canada and was promoted to Officer in 1999.

Russell, Don Johnson, and Geoff Carnell collaborated in the effort to get permission to use the royal designation for the Royal St. John's Regatta in 1993.

Arms

References

Biography at Government House The Governorship of Newfoundland and Labrador

1923 births
2001 deaths
Lieutenant Governors of Newfoundland and Labrador
Officers of the Order of Canada
Businesspeople from St. John's, Newfoundland and Labrador